Eobrachyopidae is a family of dvinosaurian temnospondyls.

References 

Dvinosaurs
Amphibian families